Karl Tamm (26 August 1872 Vaimastvere Parish (now Jõgeva Parish), Kreis Dorpat – 22 May 1940 Uus-Auvere Parish, Virumaa) was an Estonian politician. He was a member of II Riigikogu.

References

1872 births
1940 deaths
People from Jõgeva Parish
People from Kreis Dorpat
Farmers' Assemblies politicians
Members of the Riigikogu, 1923–1926
Members of the Riigikogu, 1926–1929
Members of the Riigikogu, 1929–1932
Members of the Riigikogu, 1932–1934